Chloroclystis rufitincta is a moth in the family Geometridae. It is found on Java.

References

External links

Moths described in 1898
rufitincta